Al-Midaina is a city in the Basrah Governorate of Iraq

References

District capitals of Iraq
Populated places established in 1574
Populated places in Basra Province